Elias Elton Dummer (born March 3, 1983) is a Canadian musician, songwriter, and writer based in Tennessee. Along with his band Elias, he was the principal songwriter, founding member, lead singer, and pianist in the contemporary Christian band the City Harmonic, from 2009 until 2017, and released his first solo music in over a decade in 2019.

Early life and education
Dummer was born and raised in Hamilton, Ontario. He attended Westmount High School.

Career
Dummer started The City Harmonic with guitarist Aaron Powell, bassist Eric Fusilier, and drummer Joshua Vanderlaan in 2009 after they served together as the house worship band for an inter-denominational event for students focused on "worship and mission" called CrossCulture. The band was then commissioned by the TrueCity movement of churches in Hamilton, Ontario. The band released an EP, Introducing the City Harmonic in 2010.

Dummer's his song "Manifesto" became the walkup song for baseball player Seth Smith, and served as the theme song for 2011's National Day of Prayer, in addition to being performed live at Passion 2013 by Charlie Hall.

In 2015, Dummer co-produced We Are The City Harmonic, a documentary about the social impact of churches working together in Hamilton, with Jesse Hunt and Eric Fusilier.

The City Harmonic disbanded in 2017. Dummer and his family moved to Tennessee; after first releasing a series of singles to streaming platforms beginning in November 2018, Dummer released his debut album as solo artist, The Work Vol. 1, on February 8, 2019; his debut single "Enough" received sufficient radio play to appear for 26 weeks on the Billboard Hot Christian Songs chart. In 2020, "Expectation" appeared on charts in more than 30 countries around the world.

Songwriting 
Dummer's career began as a songwriter, with songs like "Honestly" and "Do You Hear The Sound" released under Spring Hill Worship in 2005. With his band Elias, he wrote "Faithful Forever" winning a Covenant Award in 2008. In addition to his releases as a solo artist, Elias, and with The City Harmonic, Dummer has contributed to a number of projects for other artists. Dummer has written with Building 429 Newsong, Zealand Worship, Big Daddy Weave, Dan Bremnes, and Todd Smith.

Writing 
Dummer has contributed to Huffington Post and ChurchLeaders.com on faith and culture.

Recognition
As a solo artist and as the founding member of The City Harmonic, Dummer has received a Juno Award (and two additional nominations), 12 Covenant Awards (with 26 more nominations), and a Dove Awards nomination.

Personal life
Dummer and his wife Meaghan have five children. Together with Travis Garner, they helped to plant The Village Nashville in 2016, a church in Nolensville, Tennessee.

Discography

As Frontman for Elias

As frontman in The City Harmonic

Singles with The City Harmonic

Solo albums 

The Work Vol. 1 (2019) February 8, 2019

Singles as a Solo Artist

Awards

GMA Canada Covenant Awards

References

External links

True City movement

1983 births
Living people
Canadian performers of Christian music
Musicians from Hamilton, Ontario
21st-century Canadian male singers
21st-century Canadian pianists
Canadian male singer-songwriters
Canadian singer-songwriters
Canadian expatriates in the United States
Canadian male pianists